Ausma may refer to:

 Ausma (given name), a Latvian given name
 Dawn (2015 film), a Latvian film, released as Ausma in Latvia
 Ausma, a former association football club in the Latvian SSR Higher League; see 1968 Latvian SSR Higher League for example
 KA-07 Ausma, a Latvian Naval Forces coastal patrol boat which entered service in 1994
 SS Ausma, a cargo ship sunk in World War II; see List of shipwrecks in August 1941

See also
 Ozma (disambiguation)